Transnistria does not require foreign visitors to obtain a visa; they can stay for up to 45 days without a residence permit. Also, citizens of 3 other Post-Soviet disputed states can travel visa free to Transnistria. All members of the Community for Democracy and Rights of Nations have agreed to abolish visa requirements for their citizens. This includes:

Visa policy map

See also

Visa requirements for Transnistrian citizens
Visa policy of Moldova
Visa policy of Artsakh
Visa policy of Abkhazia
Visa policy of South Ossetia

References

Transnistria
Foreign relations of Transnistria